Sir Benjamin Chapman, 1st Baronet was an Anglo-Irish landowner.

He was educated at Trinity College, Dublin. Sir Benjamin had Killua Castle, County Westmeath built as his family home. He was created first baronet of Killua Castle on 10 February 1782. He died in 1810 and was succeeded by his brother Sir Thomas Chapman, 2nd Baronet.

References

18th-century births
1810 deaths
18th-century Anglo-Irish people
19th-century Anglo-Irish people
Baronets in the Baronetage of Ireland
Alumni of Trinity College Dublin
People from County Westmeath
Chapman baronets